"Angela" is a song recorded by American folk rock band The Lumineers for their second studio album, Cleopatra, and released as the album's third single on April 1, 2016.

Background
The Lumineers have said that the song "Angela," is about "a small town success story struggling to escape her past." During an interview, The Lumineers also mentioned how the name "Angela" comes from lead singer Wesley Schultz's ex-girlfriend Angela Henard; noting:
 Through Facebook, The Lumineers premiered a twenty-one second long snippet of a live performance of the song on April 1, 2016.

Music video
The official music video was  released via the Lumineers' YouTube and Vevo accounts on September 13, 2016. As of September, 2021, it has gained over 55 million views.

The Ballad of Cleopatra 
The Ballad of Cleopatra is a compilation of the story in the music videos for "Ophelia", "Cleopatra", "Sleep on the Floor", "Angela" and "My Eyes", all songs from the album Cleopatra. The video was released on the Lumineers YouTube channel on April 27, 2017.

Live performances
On April 1, 2016, The Lumineers premiered the song "Angela," with a live performance at the iHeartRadio music theater in LA. The performance was aired on Audience Network, at 9pm on April 8, 2016. The Lumineers also performed the song for KEXP at the Columbia City Theater; and on April 16, 2016, they performed the song for The Saturday Sessions, a weekly music slot featured on the daily morning news program, CBS This Morning. They also performed the song at the 2016 Americana Music Honors & Awards.

Track listing

Charts

Weekly charts

Year-end charts

References

External links

The Lumineers songs
2016 songs
2016 singles
Dualtone Records singles